Michalis Morfis (born January 15, 1979 in Cyprus) is a Cypriot footballer (goalkeeper) who plays for Doxa Katokopias in Cypriot First Division.

Club career
He was a key member of APOEL from 1997 until 2010.  

He came out of APOEL's youth system and he has proven himself in the Cypriot Championship and also internationally through the national team, qualification matches of UEFA Champions League and UEFA Cup.

International career
Morfis is also a member of the Cypriot National Team, having 22 appearances.

External links
 Michalis MOFRIS in action for national team.
 

1979 births
Living people
Cypriot footballers
Cyprus international footballers
APOEL FC players
Anagennisi Deryneia FC players
Doxa Katokopias FC players
Association football goalkeepers
PAEEK players
Sportspeople from Nicosia